During the 1991–92 season, English football team Newcastle United participated in the Football League Second Division.

The season started with much promise but quickly deteriorated into a relegation battle. Manager Ossie Ardiles struggled to add to his squad of talented youngsters due to lack of funds, the truth being the club was severely in debt. At one point it had looked like Newcastle would be relegated and could go out of business.

Sir John Hall had all but taken control of the club, and replaced Ardiles with Kevin Keegan on 5 February 1992. An improvement in form helped Newcastle to narrowly avoid relegation from the Second Division, with their survival only confirmed on the last day of the season. They finished 20th, two places above the relegation zone – their lowest League finish ever.

Season synopsis

In a season that saw a change of manager the club saw three different chairmen, original chairman Gordon McKeag under pressure from the Magpie Group consortium stepped down to be replaced by board member George Forbes before the head of the Magpie Group since the late 1980s, Sir John Hall, replaced Forbes as chairman.

If relegated to the third tier of English football, it would be for the first time in Newcastle United's history. The newly installed chairman changed the team's manager to Kevin Keegan, a former Newcastle player, who led the team to safety in the last few weeks of the season.

Hall presided over a period of boardroom calm at the club, debts were restructured and the funds were made available for team strengthening. When Kevin Keegan returned to Tyneside to replace Ardiles as manager on a short-term contract on 5 February 1992, taking what he claimed to be the only job that could tempt him back into football, United were struggling at the wrong end of the old Second Division.

Just as in the 1980s, Keegan's mere presence captivated the region. United's disgruntled supporters became excited, 
expectant ones over-night. St James' Park was regularly packed to capacity once again and United confirmed their Second Division survival with a 2–1 win at Leicester on the last day of the season. Even this win relied on a last-minute own goal.

Even though the club had narrowly avoided relegation, the club's supporters were overjoyed with the choice of manager and the prospect of a bright new start. 
The following season would see the re-emergence of Newcastle United as a major force in English football and in 1993–94 they were challenging for the Premiership title.

Appearances, goals and cards
(Substitute appearances in brackets)

Starting XI
These are the most used starting players (all competitions).

Coaching staff

Matches

League Division 2

FA Cup

Football League Cup

Zenith Data Systems Cup

External links
Flirting with Relegation: Newcastle United 1991/92 Season, James Williams, Leazes Terrace

Newcastle United F.C. seasons
Newcastle United